Menno Versteeg is a Canadian musician, best known as the frontman for indie rock group Hollerado. Versteeg received a nomination for Recording Package of the Year at the 2014 Juno Awards for his work on Hollerado's White Paint.

In 2018 Versteeg became a member of Canadian supergroup Anyway Gang; they released their first album in November of that year. As Mav Karlo, Versteeg released a debut solo album, Reno Tapes, on March 9, 2020.

In 2009 Versteeg co-founded the record label Royal Mountain Records. He received attention for providing a $1,500/band mental health fund from Royal Mountain Records to help bands deal with the stress that can come with touring and performing  based on the understanding he gained from his own experiences as he struggled with mental health while on tour.  In July 2020, Versteeg auctioned three cassettes, each containing a recording of a cover song. Versteeg matched the highest bidder and the total amount was donated to the Art for Aid Project, a Métis-run organization that supports First Nations, Inuit, and Métis art education programs.

Personal life 
Versteeg is married to actress Annie Murphy. Versteeg collaborated with Murphy and Nick Boyd, a Hollerado bandmate, on the song “A Little Bit Alexis” performed by Murphy in the season five episode of Schitt's Creek.

In 2013, Murphy and Versteeg's Toronto apartment (on Medland Street in The Junction) burned down.

References 

Canadian indie rock musicians
Canadian rock singers
Living people
Musicians from Ottawa
Date of birth missing (living people)
Year of birth missing (living people)
Canadian rock guitarists